The following is a list of notable deaths in November 2014.

Entries for each day are listed alphabetically by surname. A typical entry lists information in the following sequence:
Name, age, country of citizenship and reason for notability, established cause of death, reference.

November 2014

1
Leslie Armour, 83, Canadian philosopher.
Joel Barnett, Baron Barnett, 91, British politician, MP for Heywood and Royton (1964–1983), Chief Secretary to the Treasury (1974–1979).
Gustau Biosca, 86, Spanish football player (Barcelona) and coach.
Beverly Schmidt Blossom, 88, American dancer and choreographer, cancer.
Harold Blumenfeld, 91, American classical composer.
Ben Cayenne, 70, Trinidadian Olympic runner (1968), cancer.
Anne Cluysenaar, 78, Belgian-born Welsh poet and writer.
Jackie Fairweather, 46, Australian triathlete and long-distance runner, suicide.
Alberto Johannes Först, 87, German-born Brazilian Roman Catholic prelate, Bishop of Dourados (1990–2001).
Olle Häger, 79, Swedish journalist and television producer.
Hugues Le Bars, 64, French film music composer.
Brittany Maynard, 29, American activist for assisted suicide, physician-assisted suicide.
Abednigo Ngcobo, 64, South African footballer (Kaizer Chiefs), heart attack.
Piauí, 27, Brazilian footballer (Atlético-PR), shot.
Jean-Pierre Roy, 94, Canadian baseball player (Brooklyn Dodgers).
Donald Saddler, 96, American dancer and choreographer.
Ivor Seemley, 85, English footballer (Sheffield Wednesday, Stockport County, Chesterfield).
Michael H. Shamberg, 62, American music video producer (True Faith).
Vira Silenti, 83, Italian actress, traffic collision.
Thomas W. Sneddon, Jr., 73, American politician and district attorney, cancer.
Bernard Spitzer, 90, American real estate developer and philanthropist.
Wayne Static, 48, American singer and musician (Static-X), multiple drug intoxication.
Hajime Tamura, 90, Japanese politician.
Kazuko Yanaga, 67, Japanese voice actress (Ace wo Nerae!, Armored Trooper Votoms), sepsis.

2
Paul J. Andree, 90, American football coach.
Acker Bilk, 85, British jazz clarinetist ("Stranger on the Shore").
Jesse Branson, 72, American basketball player (Philadelphia 76ers, New Orleans Buccaneers).
Dick Breaden, 69-70, Australian rugby league footballer.
Michael Coleman, 58, American Chicago blues guitarist, singer and songwriter, heart failure.
Pierre Daix, 92, French journalist, writer and biographer (Pablo Picasso).
Valentina Dimitrova, 58, Bulgarian Olympic athlete (1980).
Herman Eisen, 96, American immunologist and cancer researcher.
Mary Froning, 80, American baseball player (AAGPBL).
Roger Halvorson, 80, American politician.
G. L. Harriss, 89, British medieval historian.
Fumiko Hayashida, 103, American subject of iconic photo of internment of Japanese Americans.
Alan Milliken Heisey Sr., 86, Canadian political activist and author.
Veljko Kadijević, 88, Croatian Yugoslav general (Yugoslav People's Army), Minister of Defence (1988–1992).
Larry Latham, 61, American animator, producer and director (The Smurfs, TaleSpin, Challenge of the GoBots), cancer.
Georgi Milanov, 62, Bulgarian ice hockey player and coach (national team).
Herman Sarkowsky, 89, German-born American businessman and sports executive (Portland Trail Blazers, Seattle Seahawks).
Nikolaus Senn, 88, Swiss banker.
Drago Štritof, 91, Yugoslav Olympic athlete.
Vladimir Suchilin, 64, Soviet footballer.
Shabtai Teveth, 89, Israeli historian.
Robert Tripe, 41, New Zealand actor (Shortland Street, Power Rangers).
Chris White, 78, American jazz bassist.

3
Sadashiv Amrapurkar, 64, Indian actor (Ardh Satya, Sadak), lung infection.
Denise Apt, 84, American politician.
Trevor Brown, 81, South African cricketer.
Richard Calder, 71, American CIA official, heart attack.
Geoff Cox, 79, English footballer (Torquay United).
Jeremy Dale, 34, American comic book artist (GI Joe), acute disseminated encephalomyelitis.
*Mariam Fakhr Eddine, 81, Egyptian actress.
Klaus Kreuzeder, 64, German saxophonist.
Jim Leonard, 64, American photographer.
Tinus Linee, 45, South African rugby union player (Western Province, national team), motor neurone disease.
Tom Magliozzi, 77, American automotive expert and radio personality (Car Talk), complications from Alzheimer's disease.
Augusto Martelli, 74, Italian composer (Il dio serpente), conductor, arranger and television personality.
Landy Scott, 95, American midget car racing driver.
Ivan Stojmenović, 57, Serbian-born Canadian mathematician and computer scientist, traffic collision.
Nina Timofeeva, 79, Russian ballet dancer.
Gordon Tullock, 92, American economist.

4
Admire Rakti, 6, Japanese Thoroughbred racehorse, won Caulfield Cup (2014), cardiac arrest.
Araldo, 6, British-born Thoroughbred racehorse, won The Bart Cummings (2013), euthanised.
Princess Kristine Bernadotte, 82, Norwegian-born Swedish princess, widow of Prince Carl Bernadotte.
Janet Carr, 81, Australian physiotherapist and academic.
Leigh Chapman, 75, American actress (The Man from U.N.C.L.E.) and screenwriter (Dirty Mary, Crazy Larry, The Octagon), cancer.
Colin Docker, 88, English Anglican clergyman, Bishop of Horsham (1975–1991).
Joe English, 58, Irish yachtsman, sailor and sailmaker, Alzheimer's disease.
Jack Fitzsimons, 84, Irish architect and activist.
Derek Hogg, 84, English footballer (Leicester City).
Gerard W. Hughes, 90, English Jesuit priest and writer, Chaplain of University of Glasgow (1967–1975).
Mag Raj Jain, 84, Indian social activist.
Enrique Olivera, 74, Argentine politician, Chief of Government of Buenos Aires (1999–2000).
Richard Schaal, 86, American actor (The Mary Tyler Moore Show, Phyllis, Trapper John, M.D.).
Annæus Schjødt, Jr., 94, Norwegian barrister and World War II veteran.
John W. Sears, 83, American lawyer and politician.
Liudvikas Simutis, 79, Lithuanian politician.
George Edgar Slusser, 75, American writer and professor.
James Mwewa Spaita, 82, Zambian Roman Catholic prelate, Archbishop of Kasama (1990–2009).
S. Donald Stookey, 99, American inventor (CorningWare).
Eddie Stuart, 83, South African footballer.

5
Iuri Akobia, 77, Georgian chess strategist.
John Gordon Davis, 78, Rhodesian writer.
Aleksey Devotchenko, 49, Russian actor and anti-Kremlin activist.
Lane Evans, 63, American politician, member of the U.S. House from Illinois's 17th district (1983–2007), complications from Parkinson's disease.
Wally Grant, 86, American Hall of Fame ice hockey player (University of Michigan).
Roy Hartle, 83, English footballer (Bolton Wanderers).
Séamus Heery, 87, Irish Gaelic football player (Meath).
Manitas de Plata, 93, French flamenco guitarist.
Don McLaren, 81, New Zealand equine pharmaceutical businessman and Thoroughbred racehorse breeder.
Abdelwahab Meddeb, 68, Tunisian-born French poet, Islamic scholar, essayist and novelist, lung cancer.
Vladimir Movsisyan, 80, Armenian politician.
Jack Nelson, 82, American Olympic swimmer (1956) and swimming coach (1976), Alzheimer's disease.
Hans Nijman, 55, Dutch mixed martial artist, shot.
Mario Pietruzzi, 96, Italian football player and manager (Alessandria).
Jean-Jacques Rousseau, 67, Belgian filmmaker, injuries from being hit by car.

6
Évelyne Baylet, 101, French company director.
Maggie Boyle, 57, English folk singer and musician, cancer.
Werner Callebaut, 62, Belgian philosopher.
Timothy R. Corcoran, 64, American politician.
Pierre-Louis Dieufaite, 31, Haitian actor, assassinated.
Egbert Fernandes, 73, Kenyan Olympic hockey player.
Philipp Fürst, 77, German Olympic gymnast (1960, 1964).
Virgil M. Getto, 90, American politician, member of the Nevada Assembly.
Len Jordan, 94, New Zealand rugby league player (Ponsonby, Auckland, national team).
Victor Kostetskiy, 73, Russian actor.
Sir Tommy Macpherson, 94, British Army officer and businessman.
Carole Mathews, 94, American actress (The Californians).
Sam Mbah, 50-51, Nigerian author, lawyer and activist.
Gerald E. Miller, 95, American vice admiral.
Alok Nembang, 41, Nepalese film director, suicide by hanging.
Jones Osborn, 93, American newspaper editor, publisher and politician, member of the Arizona State Legislature (1971–1991).
Carl Persson, 94, Swedish jurist and politician, Governor of Gothenburg and Bohus (1979–1980) and Halland (1978–1979), Police Commissioner (1964–1978).
Vivienne Price, 83, British music educator.
Sir Anthony Reeve, 76, British diplomat, Ambassador to Jordan (1988–1991) and South Africa (1991–1994), High Commissioner to South Africa (1994–1996).
Rick Rosas, 65, American session musician (Etta James, Joe Walsh, Crosby, Stills, Nash & Young).
William Rosenberg, 94, Danish actor.
Jaroslav Šíp, 83, Czech Olympic basketball player.
Fred Stürmer, 87, Luxembourgian Olympic boxer.
Naoki Tanemura, 78, Japanese railway writer.

7
Turki Mash Awi Zayid Al Asiri, 39, Saudi Arabian terrorist, shot.
Alex Bain, 78, Scottish footballer (Motherwell, Huddersfield Town, Falkirk). (death announced on this date)
Ferenc Csentery, 76, Hungarian-born American sculptor.
Connie Dion, 96, Canadian ice hockey player (Detroit Red Wings).
Bob Ewbank, 86, American football player.
Lincoln D. Faurer, 86, American air force officer, Director of the National Security Agency (1981–1985).
Zoltán Gera, 91, Hungarian actor (Escape to Victory, Sunshine, Music Box).
Bill Green, 97, English Battle of Britain fighter pilot.
Rudolf Halin, 80, German graph theorist (Halin graph).
Francis Harvey, 89, Irish poet.
Kajetan Kovič, 83, Slovene writer.
Ian Michael, 99, British academic, Vice-Chancellor of the University of Malawi (1964–1973). (death announced on this date)
Allen Ripley, 62, American baseball player (Boston Red Sox, San Francisco Giants).
Rough Habit, 28, New Zealand Thoroughbred racehorse, euthanised.
Dan Samuel, 4th Viscount Samuel, 89, British businessman and aristocrat.
Torbjørn Sikkeland, 91, Norwegian physicist.
Solwhit, 10, French-bred Irish-trained Thoroughbred racehorse, fall while training.
Juan Taverna, 66, Argentine footballer (Club Atlético Banfield).
Dwivedula Visalakshi, 85, Indian Telugu language writer.
Alex Way, 89, Australian VFL player (Carlton).

8
Donald L. Allegrucci, 78, American politician, member of the Kansas Senate.
Brian Connor, 68, American pastor and exorcist.
Phil Crane, 84, American politician, member of the U.S. House from Illinois's 13th (1969–1973), 12th (1973–1993) and 8th (1993–2005) districts, lung cancer.
Volkmar Gessner, 77, German sociologist.
Luigi Gorrini, 97, Italian World War II pilot.
Hannes Hegen, 89, German illustrator and caricaturist.
Ivan Ionaș, 58, Moldovan politician, MP (since 2010).
Archibald Johnstone, 90, Canadian businessman and politician, Senator for Prince Edward Island (1998–1999).
Michael Leighton, 60, Australian politician, member of the Victorian Legislative Assembly for Preston (1988–2006).
Joseph Melrose, 69, American diplomat, ambassador to Sierra Leone (1998–2001).
Meesai Murugesan, 84, Indian actor and musician.
Don Paul, 89, American football player.
Giovan Battista Pirovano, 77, Italian footballer (Fiorentina).
*Hugo Sánchez Portugal, 30, Mexican sports commentator and footballer, carbon monoxide poisoning.
Ricardo Rusticucci, 68, Argentine Olympic sport shooter.
Ernie Vandeweghe, 86, American basketball player (New York Knicks).
Audrey White, 87, English model and author.
Sammy Wilson, 82, Scottish footballer (Celtic).
Otto Ziege, 88, German racing cyclist.

9
Gabriel Abossolo, 75, Cameroonian footballer.
Rubén Alvarez, 53, Argentine golf player, cancer.
Saud bin Muhammed Al Thani, 48, Qatari royal and art collector.
Annemarie Buchner, 90, German Alpine skier, Olympic silver and bronze medalist (1952), German Sportswoman of the Year (1948).
Jens Bugge, 84, Norwegian Supreme Court judge.
Russell Christopher, 84, American operatic baritone.
Fred Doty, 90, Canadian football player (Toronto Argonauts).
Juan Antonio Flores Santana, 87, Dominican Roman Catholic prelate, Archbishop of Santiago de los Caballeros (1992–2003), fall.
Eugene Grazia, 80, American ice hockey player, Olympic champion (1960).
Éric Koechlin, 64, French Olympic slalom canoeist (1972).
Jeanne Macaskill, 82, New Zealand painter.
Óscar Moncada, 78, Nicaraguan politician, President of the National Assembly (1999–2001), MP (1997–2011), heart attack.
R. A. Montgomery, 78, American author (Choose Your Own Adventure).
Willy Monty, 75, Belgian Olympic racing cyclist (1960).
Kelvin Moore, 57, American baseball player (Oakland Athletics), heart failure.
Myles Munroe, 60, Bahamian evangelist, plane crash.
M. V. Raghavan, 81, Indian politician.
Sammy Reid, 75, Scottish footballer (Motherwell, Berwick Rangers).
Paul Sarvela, 54, American educator, professor of health education.
Nikola Simić, 80, Serbian actor.
Orlando Thomas, 42, American football player (Minnesota Vikings), amyotrophic lateral sclerosis.
Joe Walsh, 71, Irish politician, Minister for Agriculture and Food (1992–1994, 1997–2004).
Annette Polly Williams, 77, American politician, member of the Wisconsin State Assembly (1981–2011).

10
Whitey Adolfson, 82, American football and wrestling coach.
Frank Allen, 70, British crystallographer.
Marianne Alopaeus, 96, Finnish-born Swedish author.
Nikki Beare, 86, American feminist, journalist, and lobbyist.
Talgat Bigeldinov, 92, Soviet military aviator.
Josip Boljkovac, 93, Croatian politician, Interior Minister (1990–1991).
Clifford Branstad, 90, American politician.
Steve Dodd, 86, Australian actor (Gallipoli, The Matrix, Quigley Down Under).
Brian Farrell, 85, British-born Irish broadcaster and journalist.
Emmitt Ford, 70, American politician, member of the Tennessee House of Representatives (1974–1981).
Wayne Goss, 63, Australian politician, Premier of Queensland (1989–1996), brain tumour.
Sally Hardcastle, 69, British broadcaster (Woman's Hour, The World Tonight).
Homer Heck, 78, American politician, member of the West Virginia Senate (1980–1984, 1988–1992).
Syed Mainul Hossain, 63, Bangladeshi structural engineer and architect (National Martyrs' Memorial), cardiac arrest.
Johar, 15, American Thoroughbred racehorse.
Jovian, 20, American-born lemur actor (Zoboomafoo), kidney failure.
Ernest Kinoy, 89, American writer (Roots, Dimension X, The Defenders), pneumonia.
John Hans Krebs, 87, American politician, member of the U.S. House from California's 17th district (1975–1979).
John Spencer Letts, 80, American federal judge.
Geula Nuni, 72, Israeli actress (Sallah Shabati, I Like Mike) and singer, cancer.
Doc Paskowitz, 93, American surfer.
Al Renfrew, 89, American ice hockey player and coach (Michigan Wolverines).
Shi Changxu, 93, Chinese material scientist.
Ken Takakura, 83, Japanese actor (The Yakuza, Black Rain), malignant lymphoma.
Gaetano Varcasia, 55, Italian actor and voice actor, cancer.
Ruth Whitaker, 77, American politician, member of the Arkansas Senate (2001–2013).
Tomas Young, 34, American anti-Iraq War activist, subject of Body of War.

11
Big Bank Hank, 58, American rapper (The Sugarhill Gang), kidney complications from cancer.
Servando Chávez Hernández, 78, Mexican politician, Governor of Michoacán (1970–1974).
Jessie Clarke, 99, Australian social worker, welfare officer, and refugee advocate.
John Doar, 92, American lawyer and civil rights activist, heart failure.
Joe Dunne, British soldier.
Johnny Dyer, 75, American blues musician.
Mark Dyer, 84, American Episcopal prelate, Bishop of Bethlehem, Pennsylvania (1982–1995).
James Erb, 88, American composer, arranger and musicologist.
Mike Faulk, 61, American politician and judge, Tennessee State Senator (2008–2012), throat and liver cancer.
Rebekah Gibbs, 41, British actress (Casualty), breast cancer.
Philip G. Hodge, 94, American materials scientist.
John Kotz, 84, British politician, Mayor of Hackney.
Erik Sture Larre, 100, Norwegian Resistance member during World War II.
Caetano Lima dos Santos, 98, Brazilian bishop of the Roman Catholic Church.
Jan Lindhardt, 76, Danish theologian and writer, Bishop of Roskilde (1997–2008), Alzheimer's disease.
Harry Lonsdale, 82, American scientist, entrepreneur and politician, heart failure.
Zillur Rahman Siddiqui, 86, Bangladeshi academic.
Donald F. Steiner, 84, American biochemist.
Tjokorda Raka Sukawati, 83, Indonesian civil engineer (Sosrobahu).
Carol Ann Susi, 62, American actress (The Big Bang Theory, Cats & Dogs, Just Go with It), cancer.

12
Robert Keith Alexander, 84, Canadian politician.
Mirta Arlt, 91, Argentine writer, translator, professor and researcher, heart attack.
John Briscoe, 66, South African environmental engineer, colon cancer.
Mary Burkett, 90, English supporter of the arts.
Buddy Catlett, 81, American jazz musician.
Ravi Chopra, 68, Indian film producer and director, lung ailment.
Warren Clarke, 67, British actor (Dalziel and Pascoe, A Clockwork Orange, Top Secret!).
David Mackay, 80, British architect.
Carlos Emilio Morales, 75, Cuban jazz guitarist.
Richard Pasco, 88, British actor (Yesterday's Enemy, Rasputin the Mad Monk, Mrs. Brown).
Jiří Petr, 83, Czech agroscientist.
Marge Roukema, 85, American politician, member of the U.S. House from New Jersey's 7th and 5th districts (1981–2003), Alzheimer's disease.
Valery Senderov, 69, Soviet-born Russian dissident.
Viktor Serebryanikov, 74, Soviet-born Ukrainian footballer (Metalurh Zaporizhya, Dynamo Kyiv, Soviet national team).
Bernard Stonehouse, 88, British polar scientist (Stonehouse Bay, Mount Stonehouse).
Chhel Vayeda, 79, Indian film set designer and art director.

13
Jahangir Mohammad Adel, Bangladeshi politician.
María José Alvarado, 19, Honduran beauty pageant winner, Señorita Honduras (2014), shot.
Manoel de Barros, 97, Brazilian poet.
Kakha Bendukidze, 58, Georgian politician, heart failure.
Bill Brewster, 90, Canadian politician, member of the Yukon Legislative Assembly (1982–1996).
Terry Bulloch, 98, British pilot.
Mike Burney, 76, English saxophonist (Wizzard), cancer.
Gus Cremins, 93, Irish Gaelic football player (Kerry GAA).
Krystian Czernichowski, 84, Polish Olympic basketball player.
Alvin Dark, 92, American baseball player (Boston Braves, New York Giants) and manager (San Francisco Giants, Cleveland Indians), Alzheimer's disease.
Mioljub Denić, 88-89, Serbian chief physician, cardiologist, basketball player and coach.
Marion Downs, 100, American audiologist.
Sir William Dugdale, 92, British football executive and aristocrat, Chairman of Aston Villa (1975–1982).
Dennis Elwell, 84, British astrologer.
Robert A. Falk, 88, American farmer and politician, member of the Minnesota House of Representatives (1969–1972).
Armand V. Feigenbaum, 92, American quality control expert and businessman.
Alexander Grothendieck, 86, German-born French mathematician, winner of the Fields Medal (1966).
Howie Lee, 83, Canadian Olympic ice hockey player (1956).
Ma Faxiang, 61, Chinese Navy vice admiral, suicide by jumping.
Chris Meffert, 71, American politician, member of the Florida House of Representatives.
Richard E. Morgan, 77, American political scientist.
Lucilla Morlacchi, 78, Italian actress (The Leopard).
Reg Parker, 87, British rugby league player and international coach.
Irving Peress, 97, American dentist, investigated by Army-McCarthy hearings for alleged communist espionage.
Jim Storrie, 74, Scottish footballer (Leeds United).
Edward Summer, 68, American writer and director.
Del Youngblood, 79, American college baseball coach.

14
Marius Barnard, 87, South African surgeon.
Henri Brincard, 74, French Roman Catholic prelate, Bishop of Le Puy-en-Velay (since 1988).
Stephen Bragg, 90, British engineer.
Diem Brown, 34, American reality show personality (The Challenge), ovarian and colon cancer.
Wally Buhaj, 73, Australian footballer.
Jane Byrne, 81, American politician, Mayor of Chicago (1979–1983).
Albert E. Castel, 86, American historian and author.
Alberto Madruga da Costa, 74, Azorean politician and businessman.
Philip Joseph Cox, 92, British officer.
Dave Dephoff, 86, New Zealand long jumper and decathlete.
Tulio Halperín Donghi, 88, Argentine historian.
Eugene Dynkin, 90, Soviet-born American mathematician.
Bobby Epps, 82, American football player (New York Giants).
Kjell Hvidsand, 73, Norwegian footballer.
Adib Jatene, 85, Brazilian cardiologist and politician, Minister of Health (1992, 1995–1996), heart attack.
Glen A. Larson, 77, American writer and producer (Battlestar Galactica, Knight Rider, Magnum, P.I.), esophageal cancer.
James A. Lebenthal, 86, American businessman, heart attack.
Robert E. Littell, 78, American politician, member of the New Jersey Senate (1992–2008).
Michael O'Brien, 81, Irish hurling manager (Cork GAA).
Zaki Osman, 82, Egyptian international footballer.
Morteza Pashaei, 30, Iranian pop singer, stomach cancer.
Peter Rajah, 63, Malaysian footballer (Sabah, national team), heart attack.
Ángel Federico Robledo, 97, Argentinian politician.
Lino Spiteri, 76, Maltese politician, Finance Minister (1981–1983, 1996–1997).
Afonso Van-Dunem, 73, Angolan diplomat and politician.
Paul Vaughan, 89, British journalist.
Cherry Wainer, 79, South African musician (Lord Rockingham's XI).

15
Max Birnstiel, 81, Swiss molecular biologist, heart failure.
Jack Bridger Chalker, 96, British World War II artist.
Bunny Briggs, 92, American tap dancer.
Ashok K. Chandra, 66, Indian computer scientist.
Lucien Clergue, 80, French photographer.
Sylvia Edlund, 69, Canadian botanist.
Nissim Eliad, 95, Israeli politician.
Leslie Feinberg, 65, American transgender activist and author.
Hunter J. Francois, 90, Saint Lucian politician and government minister.
Dame Mary Glen-Haig, 96, British Olympic fencer.
Werner Haase, 80, German Olympic skier.
Richard F. Johnston, 89, American ornithologist and author.
Wycliffe Kiyingi, 85, Ugandan playwright.
Valéry Mézague, 30, Cameroonian footballer (Montpellier, Sochaux, national team).
Serge Moscovici, 89, Romanian-born French social psychologist.
Terence Rees, 86, British microbiologist.
John Sparnon, 71, New Zealand rugby league player.
John Wansacz, 78, American politician, member of the Pennsylvania House of Representatives, leukemia.
Reg Withers, 90, Australian politician, Senator (1966, 1968–1987), Lord Mayor of Perth (1991–1994).
Marvin Zelen, 83, American biostatistician.

16
Héctor Arredondo, 44, Mexican actor (Capadocia), pancreatic cancer.
Javier Azagra Labiano, 91, Spanish Roman Catholic prelate, Bishop of Cartagena (1978–1998).
Antoni Maria Badia i Margarit, 94, Spanish Catalan linguist and philologist.
Andrew Bucci, 92, American artist.
Charles Champlin, 88, American film critic and writer, Alzheimer's disease.
Jovan Ćirilov, 83, Serbian theatrologist and author.
Esther M. Conwell, 92, American physicist.
Ian Craig, 79, Australian Test cricketer.
Nan Dieter-Conklin, 88, American radio astronomer.
Whammy Douglas, 79, American baseball player (Pittsburgh Pirates).
Babak Ghorbani, 25, Iranian wrestler, Asian Games champion (2010), suicide.
Dessie Hughes, 71, Irish racehorse trainer.
Juan Joseph, 27, American football player and coach (Edmonton Eskimos), shot.
Kim Ja-ok, 63, South Korean actress, lung cancer.
Sik Kok Kwong, 95, Hong Kong Buddhist monk, President of the Hong Kong Buddhist Association (1966–2014).
Binney Lock, 82, New Zealand journalist and newspaper editor (The Press), cancer.
Jadwiga Piłsudska, 94, Polish pilot and architect, World War II flying officer for the Air Transport Auxiliary.
Carl Sanders, 89, American politician, Governor of Georgia (1963–1967), complications from a fall.
Robert Sonkowsky, 83, American academic and actor.
José Viejo, 65, Spanish Olympic racing cyclist.

17
Ahmad Aladdin, 73, Jordanian general.
Peter Allen, 92, Canadian surgeon.
Natale H. Bellocchi, 88, American diplomat, Ambassador to Botswana (1985–1988), Chairman of the American Institute in Taiwan (1990–1995).
Ron Bertram, 90, Australian lawyer and politician.
Willy Burgdorfer, 89, Swiss-born American scientist, Parkinson's disease.
William Albert Bussing, 81, American ichthyologist.
Omar Chabán, 62, Argentine impresario, convicted of the República Cromañón nightclub fire, Hodgkin's lymphoma.
John T. Downey, 84, American CIA operative, held captive in China for 20 years, pancreatic cancer and Parkinson's disease.
Dr. Flori, 35, Albanian singer-songwriter, drug overdose.
Victor Elmaleh, 95, Moroccan-born American businessman.
Bill Frenzel, 86, American politician, member of the U.S. House from Minnesota's 3rd district (1971–1991), cancer.
Stanisław Majcher, 78, Polish footballer.
Warren Murdock, 70, New Zealand cricketer.
Rokurō Naya, 82, Japanese voice actor (Saint Seiya, Yu Yu Hakusho, Eureka Seven: AO).
Jan Thomas Njerve, 87, Norwegian painter.
Ilija Pantelić, 72, Serbian Yugoslav footballer.
Jimmy Ruffin, 78, American soul singer ("What Becomes of the Brokenhearted").
Ray Sadecki, 73, American baseball player (St. Louis Cardinals, New York Mets), blood cancer.
J. V. Shetty, 78, Indian banker.
Patrick Suppes, 92, American philosopher.

18
Dave Appell, 92, American musician, musical arranger and record producer.
Lino Celaya, 65, Mexican politician, MP for Oaxaca (2003–2006), pancreatic cancer.
Kottarapattu Chattu Kuttan, 94, Sri Lanka doorman.
Fanny Colonna, 80, French-Algerian sociologist and anthropologist.
Pepe Eliaschev, 69, Argentine journalist and writer, pancreatic cancer.
Göran Graffman, 83, Swedish actor and film director.
Ernest W. Johnson, 90, American physiatrist and electromyographer.
Ahmad Lozi, 89, Jordanian politician, Prime Minister (1971–1973), President of the Senate (1984–1997).
Manzur Hasan Mintu, 74, Bangladeshi footballer and sports commentator.
Geertje Lycklama à Nijeholt, 76, Dutch scientist and politician, rector of the International Institute of Social Studies (1990–1995), member of the Senate (1995–2003).
Shahzada Alam Monnoo, 80, Pakistani industrialist and politician.
C. Rudhraiya, 67, Indian film director (Aval Appadithan).
Ana Raquel Satre, 89, Uruguayan operatic soprano.
Ismo Villa, 60, Finnish Olympic ice hockey player.

19
René Abeliuk, 83, Chilean lawyer, academic and politician.
Joseph B. Benedetti, 85, American politician, member of the Virginia House of Delegates (1985–1986) and Senate (1986–1998), cardiovascular disease.
Roy Bhaskar, 70, British philosopher.
Jeremiah Coffey, 81, Irish-born Australian Roman Catholic prelate, Bishop of Sale (1989–2008).
Bengt Eriksson, 83, Swedish Nordic combined skier, Olympic silver medalist (1956).
Paddy Fagan, 84, Irish footballer.
Pete Harman, 95, American businessman, opened first KFC franchise.
 Ray Heffernan, 79, Australian cricketer.
Ramón Hoyos, 82, Colombian Olympic racing cyclist (1956, 1960), Pan American Games champion (1955), heart attack.
Richard A. Jensen, 80, American theologian.
Otieno Kajwang, 55, Kenyan politician, Senator for Homa Bay (since 2013), MP for Mbita (1998–2013), cardiac arrest.
Gholam Hossein Mazloumi, 64, Iranian footballer (Esteghlal, national team), stomach cancer.
Mike Nichols, 83, German-born American director (The Graduate, Angels in America, Spamalot), Oscar winner (1968), cardiac arrest.
Leonard Olivier, 91, American Roman Catholic prelate, Auxiliary Bishop of Washington (1988–2004).
Sebelio Peralta Álvarez, 75, Paraguayan Roman Catholic prelate, Bishop of Villarrica del Espíritu Santo (1990–2008) and San Lorenzo (since 2009).
Jon Stallworthy, 79, English academic, poet and literary critic.
*Teeton Mill, 25, British Thoroughbred racehorse. (death reported on this date)
Mercy Williams, 67, Indian politician, cancer.

20
Allan J. Baker, 71, Canadian ornithologist.
John Bartram, 89, Australian Olympic runner (1948).
Márcio Thomaz Bastos, 79, Brazilian politician, Minister of Justice (2003–2007), lung failure.
Joe Bonner, 66, American jazz pianist.
Marian Brown, 87, American media personality.
Arthur Butterworth, 91, English composer and conductor.
Ben Collins, 93, American football player, traffic accident.
N. J. Dawood, 87, Iraqi translator.
Charlie Hall, 84, American politician, member of the Florida House of Representatives (1980–1982).
Han Pao-teh, 80, Taiwanese architect and curator.
Iain Hesford, 54, English footballer (Blackpool, Sunderland).
Jimmy Heung, 64, Hong Kong film producer and director, cancer.
Samuel Klein, 91, Polish-born Brazilian magnate (Casas Bahia).
Stanley McDonald, 94, Canadian-born American businessman, founder of Princess Cruises.
David Menasche, 41, American teacher and author, brain cancer.
Cayetana Fitz-James Stuart, 18th Duchess of Alba, 88, Spanish aristocrat.
Sharad Thakre, 46, Indian cricketer.

21
Abdullah H. Abdur-Razzaq, 82, American activist.
Leif Andersen, 78, Norwegian rower.
Patrick Ascione, 61, French composer.
Zdeněk Bobrovský, 80, Czech Olympic basketball player.
Richard Eder, 82, American journalist (Los Angeles Times, The New York Times), pneumonia.
Borden Mace, 94, American film producer (Animal Farm).
Vicente Paterno, 89, Filipino politician, Senator (1987–1992).
Sir Robert Richardson, 85, British army lieutenant general.
Paul von Ragué Schleyer, 84, American chemist.
Heather Southcott, 86, Australian politician.
Mary Lou Studnicka, 83, American baseball player (Rockford Peaches).
Sir John Sutton, 82, British RAF officer, Lieutenant Governor of Jersey (1990–1995).
Wang Kun, 89, Chinese opera singer and educator.

22
Fiorenzo Angelini, 98, Italian Roman Catholic prelate, President of the Pontifical Council for the Pastoral Care of Health Care Workers (1985–1996).
Margaret Aston, 82, British historian.
Lewis Baltz, 69, American visual artist and photographer.
Claire Barry, 94, American singer (The Barry Sisters).
Merle Barwis, 113, Canadian supercentenarian.
Jean-Paul Béchat, 72, French engineer and chief executive (Snecma, Safran).
Petrit Bushati, 66, Albanian diplomat.
Frank Caldwell, 93, British army major general, Assistant Chief of the General Staff (1972–1974).
Elvira Cisneros, 90, American activist.
Derek Deadman, 74,  English actor, diabetes.
James O. Ellison, 85, American federal judge.
Horst Fügner, 91, German motorcycle racer.
Don Grate, 91, American baseball (Philadelphia Phillies) and basketball player (Sheboygan Red Skins).
Bernard Heidsieck, 85, French poet, respiratory failure.
Chelva Kanaganayakam, 62, Sri Lankan-born Canadian translator and literary scholar, heart attack.
Larry Kelm, 49, American football player (Los Angeles Rams), fall.
John H. Land, 94, American politician, Mayor of Apopka, Florida (1950–1968, 1971–2014), stroke.
Mary H. Odom, 93, American politician, member of the North Carolina House of Representatives (1971–1972) and Senate (1975–1976).
Marcel Paquet, 67, Belgian philosopher.
Émile Poulat, 94, French historian and sociologist.
Art Quirk, 76, American baseball player (Baltimore Orioles, Washington Senators).
William Waffle Thomas, 94, American Air Force officer and Air Force One pilot.
Venita Wolf, 70, American actress (The Beverly Hillbillies, Star Trek, The Flying Nun).

23
Georges Badin, 87, French poet and painter.
Ida Ballasiotes, 78, American politician, member of the Washington House of Representatives.
Marion Barry, 78, American politician, Mayor of the District of Columbia (1979–1991, 1995–1999), cardiac arrest.
Dorothy Cheney, 98, American tennis player.
Bob Conners, 80, American radio personality (WTVN), mantle cell lymphoma.
Hélène Duc, 97, French actress.
Bob Gottlieb, 74, American college basketball coach (UW-Milwaukee, Jacksonville).
Anne Cowdrey, 14th Lady Herries of Terregles, 76, English racehorse trainer.
Mark Keyworth, 66, English rugby union player (Swansea, national team), heart attack.
Joseph Francis Maguire, 95, American Roman Catholic prelate, Bishop of Springfield, Massachusetts (1977–1991).
Desmond Mangham, 90, British army major general.
Metropolitan Mikhail of Asyut, 93, Egyptian prelate, Coptic Metropolitan of Asyut.
John Neal, 82, English football player and manager (Wrexham, Middlesbrough, Chelsea).
Murray Oliver, 77, Canadian ice hockey player (Boston Bruins, Minnesota North Stars, Toronto Maple Leafs), heart attack.
Clive Palmer, 71, British folk musician (The Incredible String Band).
Pat Quinn, 71, Canadian ice hockey coach and executive (Philadelphia Flyers, Toronto Maple Leafs, Vancouver Canucks).
Rudolf Reichling, 90, Swiss politician and Olympic rower.
Alla Sizova, 75, Russian ballet dancer.
David Stoddart, 77, British geographer.

24
Erzsébet Balázs, 94, Hungarian Olympic silver medallist gymnast (1948).
Louis Casely-Hayford, 78, Ghanaian engineer.
Mickey Champion, 89, American blues singer, stroke.
Murli Deora, 77, Indian politician, Minister of Petroleum and Natural Gas (2006–2011).
Jorge Herrera Delgado, 53, Mexican politician, Mayor of Durango, Durango (2004–2007), MP for Durango (since 2012), pancreatic cancer.
Reg Foulkes, 91, English footballer (Norwich City).
Alberto Gollán, 96, Argentine media executive.
Otto Hageberg, 78, Norwegian literary historian.
Harry Haythorne, 88, Australian ballet master and artistic director (Queensland Ballet, Royal New Zealand Ballet).
Peter Henderson, 88, New Zealand rugby union (Hawke's Bay, Wanganui, national team) and rugby league (Huddersfield) player and sprinter, British Empire Games bronze medalist (1950).
Nenad Manojlović, 57, Serbian Yugoslav water polo player and manager (national team).
Emy Storm, 89, Swedish actress (Emil i Lönneberga), stroke.
Viktor Tikhonov, 84, Soviet ice hockey player (VVS Moscow, Dynamo Moscow) and coach (national team).
Henry Woo, 85, Canadian politician, MLA for Edmonton-Sherwood Park (1979–1986).

25
Irvin J. Borowsky, 90, American publisher.
William B. Callaway, 71, American landscape architect.
Albert K. Cohen, 96, American criminologist.
Sitara Devi, 94, Indian Kathak dancer.
Joseph Thomas Dimino, 91, American Roman Catholic prelate, Archbishop for the Military Services (1991–1997).
Joanna Dunham, 78, English actress (The Greatest Story Ever Told).
Vladimir Gundartsev, 69, Soviet biathlete, Olympic champion (1968), world champion (1969).
Petr Hapka, 70, Czech composer.
Denham Harman, 98, American biogerontologist and professor emeritus (UNMC).
Rudolf Hoppe, 92, German chemist.
Aurelio Milani, 80, Italian footballer (Internazionale).
Geoff Mullen, 67, Australian draft resister.
Karl Maria Udo Remmes, 60, German photographer.
Hans Scarsini, 90, Austrian Olympic ice hockey player (1956).
Peter Wescombe, 82, British diplomat and co-founder of Bletchley Park Trust.

26
Tuğçe Albayrak, 22, German student, injuries sustained in an attack.
Sir Arthur Bonsall, 97, British civil servant, Director of GCHQ (1973–1978).
Carl Brettschneider, 82, American football player (Chicago Cardinals, Detroit Lions).
Don Dee, 71, American basketball player (Indiana Pacers), Olympic champion (1968).
Annemarie Düringer, 89, Swiss actress (Count Five and Die).
Malcolm Finlayson, 84, British footballer (Wolverhampton Wanderers).
Frankie Fraser, 90, British gangster, surgical complications.
Marvin Leonard Goldberger, 92, American physicist, President of the California Institute of Technology (1978–1987).
Mary Hinkson, 89, American dancer and choreographer, pulmonary fibrosis.
Fikret Kırcan, 94, Turkish Olympic footballer (1948).
János Konrád, 73, Hungarian water polo player, Olympic champion (1964).
Arthur Montford, 85, Scottish football commentator.
Tapan Raychaudhuri, 90, Indian historian.
Sabah, 87, Lebanese singer and actress.
Aaron Shirley, 81, American physician and civil rights activist.
Gordon Curran Stewart, 75, American publisher and speechwriter, emphysema.
Gilles Tremblay, 75, Canadian ice hockey player (Montreal Canadiens).
Peter Underwood, 91, British author, broadcaster and paranormalist.
William W. Wiedrich, 83, American Episcopal prelate, Bishop of Chicago (1991–1997).
Ángel Tulio Zof, 86, Argentine football player and coach (Rosario Central).

27
Célia Bertin, 94, French writer.
Wanda Błeńska, 103, Polish physician and missionary.
Curley Bridges, 80, American singer, pianist and songwriter, cancer.
Wynn Chamberlain, 87, American artist, filmmaker and author.
Richard T. Cooney, 81, American politician, member of the New Hampshire House of Representatives.
August Gottschalk, 92, German footballer.
Phillip Hughes, 25, Australian cricketer, vertebral artery dissection leading to subarachnoid haemorrhage.
P. D. James, 94, English crime novelist (The Children of Men, Death Comes to Pemberley).
Valeri Kalachikhin, 75, Russian Olympic champion volleyball player (1964).
Jack Kyle, 88, British rugby union player and surgeon.
Mordecai Lawner, 86, American actor (Annie Hall, Ghostbusters II, Raw Deal).
William Lonc, 84, Canadian Jesuit priest, translator and physicist.
Israel Ledesma Magaña, 60, Mexican politician, MP for the State of Mexico (2009–2012), cancer.
Stanisław Mikulski, 85, Polish theatre and film actor (Stawka większa niż życie).
Fernance B. Perry, 93, Bermudian businessman.
Terry Sanderson, 62, Canadian lacrosse coach and manager.
Arne Serck-Hanssen, 89, Norwegian Olympic rower and physician (1948).
Meta Truscott, 97, Australian diarist and historian.
Viktor Ulyanich, 65, Russian boxer.
Wang Yung-tsai, 93, Taiwanese industrialist (Formosa Plastics Group).
Frank Yablans, 79, American film producer and screenwriter, President of Paramount Pictures (1971–1975).

28
Said Akl, 102, Lebanese poet, writer, playwright and language reformer.
Dale Armstrong, 73, Canadian drag racer and crew chief, complications of sarcoidosis.
Emmon Bach, 85, American linguist.
Brumsic Brandon Jr., 87, American cartoonist, Parkinson’s disease.
Chespirito, 85, Mexican playwright, actor and screenwriter (El Chavo del Ocho, El Chapulín Colorado), heart failure.
Jean Dacquay, 86, French racing cyclist.
Luis Estevez, 83-84, Cuban-born American fashion designer and costume designer.
Thomas W. Hungerford, 78, American mathematician.
László Kapolyi, 82, Hungarian politician.
Danny Lee, 95, American special effects artist (Bonnie and Clyde, Bedknobs and Broomsticks, The Black Hole), Oscar winner (1972).
Richard B. Mather, 101, American sinologist.
Tom Moyer, 95, American businessman and amateur boxer.
Frances Nero, 71, American soul and jazz singer.
Lucidio Sentimenti, 94, Italian footballer (Juventus, Lazio).
Bunta Sugawara, 81, Japanese actor (Torakku Yarō, Spirited Away), liver cancer.

29
Dwayne Alons, 68, American politician, member of the Iowa House of Representatives (since 1999), renal cancer.
Olugbenga Ashiru, 66, Nigerian politician, Minister of Foreign Affairs (2011–2013).
Ajit Kumar Banerjee, 83, Indian environmentalist.
Dick Bresciani, 76, American baseball executive and spokesperson, leukemia.
Robert L. Clifford, 89, American associate justice (New Jersey Supreme Court).
Luc De Vos, 52, Belgian musician (Gorki) and writer, organ failure.
Bernard Fernandez, 96, American Negro league baseball player.
John Goodlad, 94, Canadian educational researcher.
Imperial Call, 25, Irish racehorse. (death announced on this date)
Brian Macdonald, 86, Canadian dancer and choreographer.
Mark Strand, 80, Canadian-born American poet and writer, United States Poet Laureate (1990–1991), liposarcoma.
Ahmad Wartam, 79, Singapore international footballer.
Pyotr Zayev, 61, Soviet-born Russian boxer, Olympic silver medalist (1980).

30
Radwa Ashour, 68, Egyptian writer and academic.
Mari Bjørgan, 64, Norwegian actress.
Paul Buissonneau, 87, Canadian actor and theatre director.
Mel Casas, 85, American artist, cancer.
Sir Fred Catherwood, 89, British politician and Christian writer, MEP (1979–1994).
Qayyum Chowdhury, 82, Bangladeshi painter.
Jean-Baptiste Donnet, 91, French chemist.
Jarbom Gamlin, 53, Indian politician, Chief Minister of Arunachal Pradesh (2011), liver thrombosis.
Go Seigen, 100, Chinese-born Japanese Go player.
Kent Haruf, 71, American novelist (Plainsong).
Norm Holland, 90, New Zealand jockey.
Rahim Jahani, 67, Afghan singer.
Ronnie Koes, 77, Canadian football player.
Martin Litton, 97, American environmentalist and editor.
Anthony Dryden Marshall, 90, American theatrical producer, CIA intelligence officer and ambassador.
Phil May, 70, Australian Olympic athlete (1968).
Paolo Mosca, 71, Italian writer and television presenter.
Ann Paludan, 86, British author. (death announced on this date)
Ian Player, 87, South African conservationist.
Pete Rodriguez, 74, American college football coach (Western Illinois Leathernecks), complications from surgery.
Maurice Saxby, 89, Australian academic and author.
Trading Leather, 4, Irish Thoroughbred racehorse, Irish Derby winner (2013), euthanized after race injury.
Mary Burke Washington, 88, American economist.
Elizabeth Young, Lady Kennet, 91, British journalist and author.

References

2014-11
 11